The 2017–18 Georgia Southern Eagles women's basketball team represents Georgia Southern University in the 2017–18 NCAA Division I women's basketball season. The Eagles, led by third year head coach Kip Drown, play their home games at Hanner Fieldhouse and were members of the Sun Belt Conference. They finished the season 5–25, 2–16 in Sun Belt play to finish in eleventh place. They lost in the first round of the Sun Belt women's tournament to Louisiana.

Previous season
They finished the season 13–17, 9–9 in Sun Belt play to finish in sixth place. They lost in the first round of the Sun Belt women's tournament to Arkansas State.

Roster

Schedule

|-
!colspan=9 style=| Exhibition

|-
!colspan=9 style=| Non-conference regular season

|-
!colspan=9 style=| Sun Belt regular season

|-
!colspan=9 style=| Sun Belt Women's Tournament

See also
2017–18 Georgia Southern Eagles men's basketball team

References

External links

Georgia Southern Eagles women's basketball seasons
Georgia Southern